The Rance is a river of northwestern France. It flows into the English Channel between Dinard and Saint-Malo.

Before reaching the Channel, its waters are barred by a 750 metre long dam forming the Rance tidal power plant.

The river is linked to the Vilaine by means of the Canal d'Ille-et-Rance.

Départements and towns along the river:
 Côtes-d'Armor: Collinée, Caulnes, Dinan
 Ille-et-Vilaine: Dinard, Saint-Malo

Hydrology and water quality
Tributaries of the Rance include:
 Croqueloir
 Clergé
 Fremeur
 Quinéford

This river has moderate turbidity and its brownish water is somewhat low in velocity due to the slight gradient of the watercourse; pH levels have been measured at 8.13 within the city of Dinan and electrical conductivity of the waters have tested at 33 micro-siemens per centimetre.

References

Rivers of France
Rivers of Côtes-d'Armor
Rivers of Ille-et-Vilaine
Rivers of Brittany
2Rance